Mzilikazi wa Afrika is a South African investigative journalist and record producer currently best known for his arrest in August 2010 on charges of fraud and defeating the ends of justice, which escalated the debate in his country about media freedom and, in light of a proposed Media Appeals Tribunal and Protection of Information Act, seeming attempts by the governing African National Congress to curtail it.

Suggestions abound that the arrest was politically motivated, coming as it did just a day after Bheki Cele, reacting to an article by Wa Afrika which detailed the police chief's involvement in a dubitable R500,000,000 lease agreement, described him as "shady" and hinted at reprisal. Wa Afrika's newspaper The Sunday Times subsequently quoted "a senior police official close to the case" as admitting, "Ja, it's political pressure," while Wa Afrika himself claimed to have been asked by his captors "whether I was involved in discrediting senior ANC office bearers in Mpumalanga.  That made me wonder whether the police were investigating a criminal or a political case.  They also wanted to know who are the big politicians I'm working with behind the scenes. This made me conclude the police were sent by politicians to harass and intimidate me."

The prosecution claims that Wa Afrika was in possession of a forged letter of resignation from Mpumalanga premier David Mabuza, whose denial and formal complaint at the Kabokweni police station in Nelspruit it was that culminated in the arrest.  The letter, faxed anonymously to The Sunday Times, had yet to be publicised.  The arrest took place on Wednesday, 4 August, at 11:15 outside The Sunday Times building in Rosebank, Johannesburg, in spite of the fact that Wa Afrika's lawyer, who has since echoed claims of political meddling, had already negotiated for him to hand himself over at the Kabokweni police station:

[S]everal police vehicles with sirens blaring pulled up alongside wa Afrika outside the Sunday Times building while he was walking to the police station. Police bundled him into an unmarked vehicle and drove off at high speed.

At 19:00 the following day, the newspaper approached the High Court in Pretoria, bringing an urgent application for the journalist's release, which acting Judge Johan Kruger ordered three hours later, following an agreement with the state. Wa Afrika was released at 22:30 and appeared in Nelspruit Regional Court on the next day, 6 August, on charges of fraud, forgery and uttering. He was released on R5,000 bail and ordered to surrender his passports, not to leave the country or interfere with state witnesses, and to report to his nearest police station once a week between 8 am and 8 pm.

Another suspect in the case, Victor Mlimi, deputy director of the Mpumalanga housing department, was according to his lawyer, Daniel Mabunda, questioned for two hours about the ANC's provincial leadership squabbles and where his own allegiances lie: "I was present when my client was asked, 'Are you destroying the image and integrity of the ANC in Mpumalanga?'  I advised my client not to answer that question.  It struck me that this has more to do with politics than a criminal case."

Asked by The Sunday Times about the negative impression created by the police's heavy-handed action against wa Afrika, Cele's spokesperson Nonkululeko Mbatha replied,"I cannot undo that impression but the fact of the matter is no one is immune from investigation of what is suspicious of criminal nature. Lastly, insinuations about a directive issued by the general (Cele) to apprehend or intimidate the journalist are incorrect and a figment of imagination."  Mabuza's spokesman also denied that he had exerted any pressure on police or that the arrest was an attempt to intimidate the journalist and countermine his investigations into the murders of Mbombela speaker Jimmy Mohlala and provincial arts and culture spokesman Sammy Mpatlanyane, whose names appeared on a "hit list" which emerged in 2009.

On 14 October 2018 it was announced that he had parted ways with the Sunday Times newspaper due to inaccurate reporting involving the so-called SARS rogue unit.

Notes 

Living people
South African journalists
1971 births